Sphingonotus is a genus of grasshoppers in the family Acrididae, subfamily Oedipodinae, found in Europe Africa, Asia and Australia.

Species
The Catalogue of Life lists:

Sphingonotus angulatus Uvarov, 1922
Sphingonotus azurescens Rambur, 1838
Sphingonotus canariensis Saussure, 1884
Sphingonotus dentatus Predtechenskii, 1937
Sphingonotus finotianus Saussure, 1885
Sphingonotus fuerteventurae Husemann, 2008
Sphingonotus morini Defaut, 2005
Sphingonotus pachecoi Bolívar, 1908
Sphingonotus paradoxus Bey-Bienko, 1948
Sphingonotus pictus Werner, 1905
Sphingonotus sublaevis Bolívar, 1908
Sphingonotus tricinctus Walker, 1870
Sphingonotus femoralis Uvarov, 1933
Sphingonotus radioserratus Johnsen, 1985
Sphingonotus turkanae Uvarov, 1938
Sphingonotus africana Johnsen, 1985
Sphingonotus albipennis Krauss, 1902
Sphingonotus altayensis Zheng & Ren, 1993
Sphingonotus amplofemurus Huang, 1982
Sphingonotus arenarius Lucas, 1849
Sphingonotus aserbeidshanicus Ramme, 1951
Sphingonotus aspera Brullé, 1840
Sphingonotus atlantica Popov, 1984
Sphingonotus atropurpureus Uvarov, 1930
Sphingonotus balteatus Serville, 1838
Sphingonotus barrizensis Descamps, 1967
Sphingonotus basutensis Dirsh, 1956
Sphingonotus beybienkoi Mishchenko, 1937
Sphingonotus brackensis Usmani, 2008
Sphingonotus brasilianus Saussure, 1888
Sphingonotus burqinensis Zheng & Yang, 2006
Sphingonotus caerulans (Linnaeus, 1767) - type species (as Gryllus caerulans L = S. caerulans caerulans L)
Sphingonotus caerulistriatus Zheng & Ren, 2007
Sphingonotus callosus Fieber, 1853
Sphingonotus candidus Costa, 1885
Sphingonotus capensis Saussure, 1884
Sphingonotus carinatus Zheng, Li & Ding, 1995
Sphingonotus coerulipes Uvarov, 1922
Sphingonotus collenettei Uvarov, 1930
Sphingonotus corsicus Chopard, 1923
Sphingonotus crevellarii Jannone, 1936
Sphingonotus diadematus Vosseler, 1902
Sphingonotus ebneri Mishchenko, 1937
Sphingonotus elegans Mishchenko, 1937
Sphingonotus erlixensis Zheng, Yang, Zhang & Wang, 2007
Sphingonotus erythropterus Sjöstedt, 1920
Sphingonotus eurasius Mishchenko, 1937
Sphingonotus fuscoirroratus Stål, 1861
Sphingonotus fuscus Predtechenskii, 1937
Sphingonotus ganglbaueri Krauss, 1907
Sphingonotus gigas Kirby, 1914
Sphingonotus glabimarginis Zheng, Yang, Zhang & Wang, 2007
Sphingonotus gobicus Chogsomzhav, 1975
Sphingonotus guanchus Johnsen, 1985
Sphingonotus gypsicola Llucià-Pomares, 2006
Sphingonotus haitensis Saussure, 1861
Sphingonotus haitiensis Saussure, 1861
Sphingonotus halocnemi Uvarov, 1925
Sphingonotus halophilus Bey-Bienko, 1929
Sphingonotus hierichonicus Uvarov, 1923
Sphingonotus hoboksarensis Zheng & Ren, 1993
Sphingonotus huangi Otte, 1995
Sphingonotus hyalopterus Zheng & Cao, 1989
Sphingonotus insularis Popov, 1957
Sphingonotus intutus Saussure, 1888
Sphingonotus isfaghanicus Predtechenskii, 1937
Sphingonotus kashmirensis Uvarov, 1925
Sphingonotus kirgisicus Mishchenko, 1937
Sphingonotus kueideensis Yin, 1984
Sphingonotus lavandulus Popov, 1980
Sphingonotus laxus Uvarov, 1952
Sphingonotus lipicus Zheng & Hang, 1974
Sphingonotus lluciapomaresi Defaut, 2005
Sphingonotus lobutatus Karny, 1910
Sphingonotus longipennis Saussure, 1884
Sphingonotus lucasii Saussure, 1888
Sphingonotus lucidus Mishchenko, 1937
Sphingonotus luteus Krauss, 1893
Sphingonotus maculatus Uvarov, 1925
Sphingonotus maroccanus Uvarov, 1930
Sphingonotus menglaensis Wei & Zheng, 2005
Sphingonotus micronacrolius Zheng & Ren, 1994
Sphingonotus minutus Mishchenko, 1937
Sphingonotus miramae Mishchenko, 1937
Sphingonotus mongolicus Saussure, 1888
Sphingonotus montanus Mishchenko, 1937
Sphingonotus nadigi Uvarov, 1933
Sphingonotus nebulosus Fischer von Waldheim, 1846
Sphingonotus nigripennis Serville, 1838
Sphingonotus nigrofemoratus Huang & Chen, 1982
Sphingonotus nigroptera Zheng & Gow, 1981
Sphingonotus niloticus Saussure, 1888
Sphingonotus ningsianus Zheng & Gow, 1981
Sphingonotus obscuratus Walker, 1870
Sphingonotus octofasciatus Serville, 1838
Sphingonotus orissaensis Jago & Bhowmik, 1990
Sphingonotus otogensis Zheng & Yang, 1997
Sphingonotus pamiricus Ramme, 1930
Sphingonotus peliepiproct Zheng & Gong, 2003
Sphingonotus personatus Zanon, 1926
Sphingonotus petilocus Huang, 1982
Sphingonotus picteti Krauss, 1892
Sphingonotus pictipes Uvarov & Dirsh, 1952
Sphingonotus pilosus Saussure, 1884
Sphingonotus punensis Dirsh, 1969
Sphingonotus qinghaiensis Yin, 1984
Sphingonotus rubescens Walker, 1870
Sphingonotus rufipes Predtechenskii, 1937
Sphingonotus rugosus Bland & Gangwere, 1998
Sphingonotus salinus Pallas, 1773
Sphingonotus satrapes Saussure, 1884
Sphingonotus savignyi Saussure, 1884
Sphingonotus scabriculus Stål, 1876
Sphingonotus somalica Johnsen, 1985
Sphingonotus striatus Li & Zheng, 1993
Sphingonotus takramaensis Zheng, Xi & Lian, 1994
Sphingonotus taolensis Zheng, 1992
Sphingonotus tenuipennis Mishchenko, 1937
Sphingonotus theodori Uvarov, 1923
Sphingonotus tipicus Zheng & Hang, 1974
Sphingonotus toliensis Zheng & Gong, 2003
Sphingonotus tristrial Zheng & Wang, 2006
Sphingonotus tsinlingensis Zheng, Tu & Liang, 1963
Sphingonotus turcicus Uvarov, 1930
Sphingonotus turcmenus Bey-Bienko, 1951
Sphingonotus tuxeni Ramme, 1952
Sphingonotus tzaidamicus Mishchenko, 1937
Sphingonotus uvarovi Chopard, 1923
Sphingonotus vitreus Saussure, 1888
Sphingonotus vosseleri Krauss, 1902
Sphingonotus willemsei Mishchenko, 1937
Sphingonotus wulumuqiensis Gong, Zheng & Niu, 2005
Sphingonotus yamalikeshanensis Gong, Zheng & Niu, 2005
Sphingonotus yantaiensis Yin, Xu & Yin, 2012
Sphingonotus yechengensis Zheng, Xi & Lian, 1994
Sphingonotus yenchihensis Zheng & Chiu, 1965
Sphingonotus yunnaneus Uvarov, 1925
Sphingonotus zandaensis Huang, 1981
Sphingonotus zebra Mishchenko, 1937
Sphingonotus zhangi Xu & Zheng, 2007
Sphingonotus zhengi Huo, 1994
Others

Gallery

References

External links
 
 

Acrididae genera
Oedipodinae